Krzysztof Kozik  (born September 2, 1978 in Tychy) is a Polish goalkeeper.

Career

Club
He was released from Piast Gliwice on 1 July 2011 and then joined GKS Katowice in August 2011.

References

External links
 

1978 births
Living people
GKS Bełchatów players
Polish footballers
People from Tychy
Association football goalkeepers
RKS Radomsko players
Piast Gliwice players
GKS Katowice players
Sportspeople from Silesian Voivodeship